Shenzhen Bay Park station is a Metro station of Shenzhen Metro Line 9. It opened on 28 October 2016.

Station layout

Exits

References

External links
 Shenzhen Metro Shenzhen Bay Park Station (Chinese)
 Shenzhen Metro Shenzhen Bay Park Station (English)

Shenzhen Metro stations
Railway stations in Guangdong
Nanshan District, Shenzhen
Railway stations in China opened in 2016